Nový Tekov is an old village and municipality in the Levice District in the Nitra Region of Slovakia.

History
In historical records the village was first mentioned in 1320.

Geography
The village lies at an altitude of 171 metres and covers an area of 29.701 km². It has a population of about 830 people.

Ethnicity
The village is approximately 85% Slovak and 15% Magyar.

Facilities
The village has a public library and football pitch. It also has its own birth registry.

References

External links

Villages and municipalities in Levice District